The Douglas DF was a commercial flying boat built by Douglas Aircraft Company, first flown on 24 September 1936.

Design and development
The DF could accommodate 32 passengers, or 16 in sleeper cabins, and was the last flying boat built by the company.

Despite acceptable handling and performance within design specifications, no commercial orders were forthcoming and faced with no domestic market for aircraft already built, the company obtained export permits for them. The first two production aircraft were sold to Japan, ostensibly for commercial airline use. The second aircraft was lost on a survey flight in 1938.  The second production pair were sold (as DF-195's) to the Soviet Union and after winterizing, were disassembled and transported to Russia via ship, where they were operated as transports by Aeroflot.

Variants
DF-151 Specification/designation of the first two aircraft sold to Japan.
DF-195 Specification/designation of the second two aircraft sold to the Soviet Union.

Specifications

References

DF-151
1930s United States airliners
Aircraft first flown in 1936
Twin piston-engined tractor aircraft